My Prince Edward is a 2019 Hong Kong romance drama film directed by Norris Wong in her directional debut. It starred Stephy Tang and Chu Pak-hong, who portrayed a pair of lovers experiencing challenges as they prepare to step into marriage. The Chinese and English titles allude to Golden Plaza in Prince Edward, a wedding-themed shopping mall. The film was the winner of 4th First Feature Film Initiative and received funding from the Film Development Fund.

Plot
Cheung Lei-fong 'Fong', who works in a bridal gown rental shop in Golden Plaza, Prince Edward, is in the 8th year of her relationship with Edward Yan, who runs his business as a wedding photographer in the same shopping mall. They are renting a flat above the mall. Despite their plan to move out of the area, Edward's mother negotiates with the owner about buying the flat, much to Fong's dismay, but Edward simply shrugs it off.

Fong learns that the marriage certificate of a divorcee bears a remark and begins to worry about her past. Ten years ago, when she severed ties with her parents, she was introduced by her friend Yee to an agent and entered a sham marriage with a mainlander. The next day, she is told by marriage registration office that she is still legally married to Yang Shuwei, whom she has little memory about, as the agent failed to file for divorce on her behalf. At a loss of what to do, Fong attempts to seek help from Yee, only to be led to a public proposal party. Before Fong can respond, Edward puts the engagement ring on her finger. She declines to hold a wedding banquet for fear that her secret will be exposed.

Fong posts a tracing notice for Yang on a newspaper and he finally shows up. He agrees to jointly file for divorce, which will take immediate effect, only if Fong helps him in applying for a one-way permit, which will allow him to apply for emigration to New York City. Fong would rather wait for unilateral divorce to take effect, but her plan is frustrated as Edward's mother decides to hold a grand banquet the next year. Left with no alternatives, Fong agrees to fake daily life photos with Yang and Yang thrusts a pile of cash into her hands. There, Fong contemplates buying a long table but votes against it as it realistically wouldn't fit in her small flat. Yang notices Edward constantly bombarding Fong with instant messages and questions her decision to give up her freedom.

Edward discovers a copy of her marriage record in her handbag and furiously questions her. Fong confesses to her past and expresses deep regrets. The pair has a brief fight but quickly makes up. The next morning, Fong has to travel to Fuzhou for a face-to-face interview, which Edward attempts to stop but in vain. She meets Yang's girlfriend and overhears that she is pregnant, forcing Yang to rethink his migration plan. Keeping mobile data switched off during her journey, Fong returns to Hong Kong but her attitude towards Edward has changed.

One day, a message from Yang triggers the most serious quarrel between them, with Fong disclosing for the first time her dissatisfaction about the wedding arrangements and his mother's intervention. Having abandoned his migration plan, Yang is willing to file for divorce immediately. Fong resigns from her job to get ready for her new life. However, when she returns home, she finds her turtle was released by her future mother-in-law. She rushes to a nearby pond in an attempt to recover her turtle and complains to Edward about the loss of freedom. Edward lovingly assures her they will remain the way they have been.

Early next morning, Fong leaves Edward a sticky note a reminder of his bad habit and boards a bus to Fuzhou, where she returns the cash to Yang. When she switches on mobile data, she ignores Edward's messages and orders a long table of her own choice.

Cast
 Stephy Tang as Cheung Lei-fong 'Fong'
 Chu Pak-hong as Edward Yan Chun-wing
 Jin Kai-jie as Yang Shuwei
 Nina Paw as Edward's mother
 Eman Lam as Yee

Production
Norris Wong is a resident of Allied Plaza, right opposite to Golden Plaza, and set the story in the area where she grew up. Wong won the 4th First Feature Film Initiative (Higher Education Institutions Group) with My Prince Edward in 2018. With shoestring budget, the filming of an important quarrel scene ran overtime, but Stephy Tang volunteered to act without extra pay. After working on a 110-minute version by Peter Chung, Wong sought opinion from William Chang, who did the final cut himself.

Release
My Prince Edward was the closing film of 2019 Hong Kong Asian Film Festival. The film was scheduled for public release in mid-April 2020, but was postponed to June as cinemas were closed due to coronavirus disease. Cheng Cheng Films has bought the distribution rights in North America.

Awards and nominations

References

External links

2019 films
2010s Cantonese-language films
Hong Kong drama films
Winners of the First Feature Film Initiative
2019 directorial debut films
2019 drama films
2010s Hong Kong films